Torture Killer is a Finnish death metal band from Turku, formed in 2002.

The band consists of five members: guitarists Jari Laine and Tuomas Karppinen, bassist Kim Torniainen, drummer Tuomo Latvala and the current vocalist Pessi Haltsonen. The band was originally a Six Feet Under cover band adopting their moniker from a Six Feet Under song, but soon began composing and performing original material in the same vein. Chris Barnes, the original singer for Cannibal Corpse and current singer for Six Feet Under, officially joined Torture Killer as lead singer in November 2005 and was a part of the recording of the album Swarm!. He left the band in January 2008. Barnes was not involved with their live performances while a part of the band.

The partnership with Barnes continued after the Swarm! period with Jari Laine writing the music for three songs on the 2013 Six Feet Under album Unborn: "Incision"; "Inferno"; "Zombie Blood Curse".  A fourth, unreleased Laine-penned track from the Unborn period, "Midnight In Hell", was eventually released on the 2018 digital Six Feet Under album, "Unburied".

Barnes also contributed the lyrics and vocals to the track "Written in Blood" on the 2013 Torture Killer album Phobia.

In June 2022, the band released the title track to their upcoming EP, Dead Inside, which was released on July 29.

Members

Current 
Jari Laine – guitar (2002–present)
Tuomo Latvala – drums (2002–present)
Tuomas Karppinen – guitar (2004–present), bass (2002–2004)
Kim Torniainen – bass (2004–present)
Pessi "Nekrosis" Haltsonen – vocals (2011–present)

Former 
Matti Liuke – vocals (2002–2004)
Taneli Hatakka – guitar (2002–2004)
Chris Barnes – vocals (2005–2008)
Juri Sallinen – vocals (2008–2011)

Timeline

Discography

Studio albums 
 For Maggots to Devour (2003)
 Swarm! (2006)
 Sewers (2009)
 Phobia (2013)

EPs 
 Torture Killer/Sotajumala (2005) (split EP w/ Sotajumala)
 I Chose Death (2012)
 Dead Inside (2022)

References

External links 
 

Finnish death metal musical groups
Metal Blade Records artists
Musical groups established in 2002
2002 establishments in Finland
Musical groups from Turku